The House of Clermont-Tonnerre is a French noble family, members of which played some part in the history of France, especially in Dauphiné, from about 1100 to the French Revolution (1789–99).

History
Sibaud, lord of Clermont in Viennois, who first appears in 1080, was the founder of the family. His descendant, another Sibaud, commanded some troops which aided Pope Calixtus II in his struggle with the Antipope Gregory VIII. In return for this service, it is said that the pope allowed him to add certain emblems, two keys and a tiara to the arms of his family.

A direct descendant, Ainard (died 1349), called Viscount of Clermont, was granted the dignity of captain-general and first baron of Dauphiné by his suzerain Humbert, dauphin of Viennois, in 1340; and in 1547 Clermont was made a county for Antoine (died 1578), who was governor of Dauphiné and the French king's lieutenant in Savoy. In 1572, Antoine's son Henri was created a duke, but as this was only a brevet title it did not descend to his son. Henri was killed before La Rochelle in 1573. In 1596 Henri's son, Charles Henri, count of Clermont (died 1640), added Tonnerre to his heritage; but in 1648 this county was sold by his son and successor, François (died 1679).

A member of a younger branch of Charles Henri's descendants was Gaspard de Clermont-Tonnerre (1688–1781). This soldier served his country during a long period, fighting in Bohemia and Alsace, and then distinguishing himself greatly at the battles of Fontenoy and Lawfeldt. In 1775, he was created Duke of Clermont-Tonnerre, and made a peer of France. As the senior marshal (c. 1747) of France, he assisted as constable at the coronation of Louis XVI in 1774. His son and successor, Charles Henri Jules, governor of Dauphiné, was guillotined in July 1794, a fate which his grandson, Gaspard Charles, had suffered at Lyon in the previous year.

A later duke, Aimé Marie Gaspard (1779–1865), served for some years as a soldier, afterwards becoming minister of marine and then minister of war under Charles X during the last days of the Bourbon Restoration, in the cabinet of the Count de Villèle. He retired to private life after the revolution of 1830. Aimé's grandson, Roger, duke of Clermont-Tonnerre, was born in 1842.

Among other distinguished members of this family was Catherine (c. 1545 – 1603), daughter of Claude de Clermont-Tonnerre. This lady, dame d'honneur to Henry II's queen, Catherine de' Medici, and afterwards wife of Albert de Gondi, duc de Retz, won a great reputation by her intellectual attainments, being referred to as the tenth muse and the fourth grace. One of her grandsons was the famous Cardinal de Retz.

Other noteworthy members of collateral branches of the family were: François (1629–1701), bishop of Noyon from 1661 until his death, a member of the French Academy, notorious for his inordinate vanity; Stanislas Marie Adelaide, comte de Clermont-Tonnerre; and Anne Antoine Jules (1749–1830), cardinal and bishop of Châlons-sur-Marne, who was a member of the states-general in 1789, afterwards retiring to Germany, and after the return of the Bourbons to France became Archbishop of Toulouse.

In 1909, Peter Kropotkin tells the story of one military commander, Clermont-Tonnerre, who in 1788 promulgated the edict which dissolved the parlement of the people of Grenoble during the French Revolution. The tocsin was rung, and the alarm spreading quickly to the neighboring villages, the peasants hastened in crowds the town. There was combat between civilians and soldiers, and many were killed. After street skirmishing, the commander's guard was rendered helpless, and Clermont-Tonnerre's palace was sacked. Clermont-Tonnerre, with an axe held over his head, had to revoke the royal edict.

See also
 Adélaïde de Clermont-Tonnerre
 Hermine de Clermont-Tonnerre
 Laure de Clermont-Tonnerre

References

External links

 Official family website
 Héraldique européenne